Oklahoma Raiders is a 1944 American Western film directed by Lewis D. Collins and starring Tex Ritter.

Plot
In This western, cowboys go to buy fresh horses for the cavalry and end up taking on two badguys and a female vigilante.

Cast        
 Tex Ritter as Steve Nolan
 Fuzzy Knight as Banjo Bonner
 Dennis Moore as Todd Wingate
 Jennifer Holt as Donna Ross aka El Vengador
 Jack Ingram as Arnold Drew
 George Eldredge as James Prescott
 John Elliott as Judge Clem Masters
 Slim Whitaker as Sheriff Seth Banning
 I. Stanford Jolley as Higgins
 Richard Alexander as Henchman Duggan (as Dick Alexander)
 Herbert Rawlinson as Colonel Rogers
 Ethan Laidlaw as Deputy Williams
 Johnny Bond as Guitar Player
 Paul Sells as Concertina Player (as Red River Valley Boys)
 Wesley Tuttle as Singer (as Red River Valley Boys)
 Jimmie Dean as Guitar Player (as Red River Valley Boys)

References

External links
 

1944 films
1940s English-language films
American Western (genre) films
1944 Western (genre) films
Universal Pictures films
Films directed by Lewis D. Collins
American black-and-white films
1940s American films